Pityrodia jamesii is a flowering plant in the mint family Lamiaceae and is endemic to Arnhem Land in the Northern Territory, Australia. It is a spreading shrub with hairy, yellowish brown stems, sticky, hairy, egg-shaped to lance-shaped leaves and white, bell-like flowers.

Description
They are crowded near the ends of the branches and are hairy and glandular with raised veins on the underside.

The flowers are arranged in the upper leaf axils with bracts and smaller bracteoles. The five sepals are joined at the base and form a bell-shaped tube that is glandular and hairy on the outside and glabrous inside. The four stamens extend slightly beyond the end of the tube, one pair slightly shorter than the other.

Taxonomy and naming
Pityrodia jamesii was first formally described in 1979 by Raymond Specht from a specimen collected from sandstone hills near Gunbalanya, Northern Territory during the third American-Australian Scientific Expedition to Arnhem Land in 1951. The description was published in Records of the American-Australian Scientific Expedition to Arnhem Land No. 3 Botany and Plant Ecology. The specific epithet (jamesii) honours Stewart James who assisted with collection of specimens and was an agricultural advisor.

Distribution
This pityrodia occurs in Arnhem Land, especially near the East and South Alligator Rivers.

Ecology 
It is one of the only food plants of the Leichhardt grasshopper.

Conservation
Pityrodia byrnesii is classified as "least concern" under the Territory Parks and Wildlife Conservation Act 2000.

References

jamesii
Plants described in 1979
Flora of the Northern Territory